Starobabichevo (İśke Bäpes) is a rural locality (a village) and the administrative centre of Starobabichevsky Selsoviet, Karmaskalinsky District, Bashkortostan, Russia. The population was 520 as of 2010. There are 7 streets.

Geography 
Starobabichevo is located 22 km south of Karmaskaly (the district's administrative centre) by road. Novobabichevo is the nearest rural locality.

References 

Rural localities in Karmaskalinsky District